Chabutro is a 2022 Gujarati-language film, directed by Chanakya Patel starring Raunaq Kamdar,  Anjali Barot, and others produced by Neha Rajora and distributed by Panorama Studios.

Plot 
Viraj is living his dream life in the US but is forced to move back to Ahmedabad due to visa issues. During this time, he meets Nivedita, an architecture student, who is completely opposite to him. Now, Viraj must make a choice. Will he choose to go back or stay here?

Cast 
 Raunaq Kamdar
 Anjali Barot
 Dharmesh Vyas
 Chhaya Vora
 Annapurna Shukla
 Bhumika Barot
 Shivam Parekh
 Akash Pandya

Development 
The film has been shot in Ahmedabad, India, along with the city of Chicago, incidentally making it the first Gujarati film shot in Chicago. The first look of the poster revels on 15 September 2022. and announce the project and begun the promotion of the film. The teaser of the film was released on 19 September, 2022. And before the festival of Navratri the most iconic Garba_(dance) song Moti Veraana released. Raunaq Kamdar and Anjali Barot started the ground promotion of the film during the Navratri season. The trailer was released on 11 October 2022, and crossed more than a millions views receiving tremendous response from the audience. The music has been acquired by Shemaroo Entertainment.

Soundtrack

Tracklist 
The soundtrack of the album is composed by Siddharth Amit Bhavsar with lyrics written by Niren Bhatt. The soundtrack album consists of four tracks.

References

External links 
 

2022 films
2020s Gujarati-language films
Films shot in Chicago
Films shot in Gujarat